Starlight (stylized as star-light) is the ninth live album and thirteenth album overall by California-based worship collective Bethel Music. The album was released on April 7, 2017, by the group's imprint label, Bethel Music. Chris Greely and Ran Jackson worked on the production of the album.

Background
Starlight was recorded in October 2016 when Bethel Music went on a Worship Nights Tour, ministering in cities across the East Coast of the United States with guest worship leader, Francesca Battistelli, and guest speakers Lisa Bevere and Havilah Cunnington.

Promotion
Three songs, "Starlight" by Amanda Cook, "Take Courage" by Kristene DiMarco and "King of My Heart" by Steffany Gretzinger and Jeremy Riddle were made available for instant download on March 17, 2017, the first day of the pre-order period in the lead up to the album's release.

Singles
A studio version of "Take Courage" was released in digital format as the lead single from the album on May 8, 2017. The song then impacted Christian radio on June 16, 2017.

Critical reception

The reception of Starlight was quite positive from various critics of CCM and contemporary worship music genres.

Joshua Andre designated the album a four and a half star rating at 365 Days of Inspiring Media, calling Starlight "a brilliant album for a well-respected church and group!" At CCM Magazine, Matt Conner rated the album four-point-five stars out of five, he cautions that "the entire album warrants repeated listens." Rating the album four and a half stars in a review at The Christian Beat, Madeleine Dittmer believes that "Starlight conveys a message of hope that God is near in our joy and in our darkness. The songs provide a way for listeners to worship in all seasons of life by proclaiming truth and providing words for moments when they may be hard to find. Bethel Music has yet again released a powerful collection that will have a lasting impact on listeners." Bestowing the album a perfect five stars in a ChurchMag review, Phil Schneider says "One thing I've learned is that there are two main camps of worship music: the anthemic and the contemplative. However, Bethel Music is forcing me to unlearn this with their new album Starlight, which boasts contemplative melodies and anthemic lyrics. The combination of this pairing produces a worship experience that brings peace to the soul while fueling the dissatisfaction that points the soul to the eternal, Almighty God, who created, sustains, and passionately pursues us." Timothy Yap of Hallels gave Starlight a four star rating in his review, concluding that "On the whole, "Starlight" does glow with some very powerful worship moments, though not all the "stars" shine with the same intensity. Nevertheless, this is an important album.  It doesn't take a prophet to predict that just as ubiquitous as the stars are, these songs are going to find their places in tomorrow's worship of the church." Jesus Freak Hideout's Josh Balogh says in his four star review: "Musically, the use of strings and synthesizer-flourishes really stand out, and created a paradox of intimacy and vastness in the majority of the songs. Lyrically, there was a deep focus on the name and worthiness of Jesus, which is right where the focus should be. All told, we have a more-than-worthy addition to the Bethel Music canon and a few new songs with which to praise our very Holy God." Awarding the album four and a half stars from NewReleaseToday, Kevin Davis states, "Starlight is best described as a stellar worship offering with an empowering theme of the Lord's Kingship reigning in our hearts in song after song." Laura Chambers, indicating in a four-and-two-fifths star review at Today's Christian Entertainment, says "Starlight's thoughtful lyrics will inspire gratitude long after the music ends. Bethel Music's stirring melodies draw listeners into the marvelous strength of God and invite them to consider Him as both powerful and personal, loyal and loving."

Commercial performance
In the week ending April 13, 2017, 20,000 equivalent album units of Starlight were sold. The album rose to No. 1 on the Billboard Christian Albums chart dated April 29, 2017. The album also made its debut on the ARIA Albums Chart at No. 15, becoming the fourth album by Bethel Music to do so. Concurrently, the song "Extravagant", which featured Steffany Gretzinger and Amanda Cook, debuted at No. 30 on the Billboard's Hot Christian Songs chart and No. 23 on the Christian Digital Songs chart with 2,000 downloads sold.

Track listing

Personnel
Adapted from AllMusic.

 Josh Baldwin — background vocals
 Francesca Battistelli — vocals
 Jesse Carmichael — additional production
 Tyler Chester — keyboards
 Amanda Cook — background vocals, vocals
 Kristene DiMarco — vocals
 Chris Estes — director
 Steffany Frizzell-Gretzinger — background vocals, vocals
 Kiley Goodpasture — creative director
 Chris Greely — engineer, guitar, keyboards, mixing engineer, producer
 Stephen James Hart — visual worship leader + design
 Kalley Heiligenthal — background vocals, vocals
 Jonathan David Helser — background vocals
 Melissa Helser — vocals
 Luke Hendrickson — keyboards
 Ran Jackson — background vocals, engineer, guitar, keyboards, percussion, producer
 Ricky Jackson — additional production
 Ted Jansen — mastering
 Brian Johnson — background vocals, executive producer
 Jenn Johnson — executive producer, vocals
 Taylor Johnson — guitar
 Jeremy Larson — strings
 Dan Mackenzie — additional production
 Hannah McClure — vocals
 Paul McClure — background vocals
 Matt Ogden — additional production, background vocals, bass, keyboards
 Michael Pope — guitar
 Aaron Redfield — percussion
 Jeremy Riddle — background vocals, vocals
 Lucas Sankey — photography
 Rick Seibold — additional production
 Bobby Strand — guitar
 Joel Taylor — executive producer
 Jonah Thompson — monitor engineer, track engineer
 Rebekah Van Tinteren — strings
 Joe Volk — drums, percussion
 David Whitworth — drums

Charts

Weekly charts

Year-end charts

Release history

References

2017 live albums
Bethel Music albums